Billy Bean and His Funny Machine is a UK children's TV series which was broadcast by the BBC in 1954. It featured a puppet called Billy Bean who operated a large fantastic machine that could produce anything he drew on the "cartoonorator". Many mistakes were made with humorous results.  Peter Hawkins who went on to make a career in children's puppet TV was the voice of Billy Bean.
Based upon Chuck Luchsinger's American children's show "Jolly Gene & His Fun Machine", like Jolly Gene, Billy Bean also ran a train and was dressed as an American locomotive engineer (train driver).
John Wright made the puppets and equipment, the series was written by Lisa Lincoln, and the puppetry was by Jane Tyson and Elizabeth Donaldson. The show was produced by Vere Lorrimer.

References
Details of the programme from whirligig-tv.co.uk
IMDB entry Billy Bean and His Funny Machine

BBC children's television shows
British television shows featuring puppetry
1954 British television series debuts
1950s British children's television series